The Irreconcilables were bitter opponents of the Treaty of Versailles in the United States in 1919. Specifically, the term refers to about 12 to 18 United States Senators, both Republicans and Democrats, who fought intensely to defeat the ratification of the treaty by the Senate in 1919. They succeeded, and the United States never ratified the Treaty of Versailles and never joined the League of Nations.

History
The Republican Party controlled the United States Senate after the election of 1918, but the Senators were divided into multiple positions on the Versailles question. It proved possible to build a majority coalition, but impossible to build a two thirds coalition that was needed to pass a treaty. One block of Democrats strongly supported the Versailles Treaty. A second group of Democrats supported the Treaty but followed President Woodrow Wilson in opposing any amendments or reservations. The largest block, led by Senator Henry Cabot Lodge, comprised a majority of the Republicans. They wanted a treaty with reservations, especially on Article 10, which involved the power of the League of Nations to make war without a vote by the United States Congress. The closest the Treaty came to passage, came in mid-November 1919, was when Lodge and his Republicans formed a coalition with the pro-Treaty Democrats, and were close to a two-thirds majority for a Treaty with reservations, but Wilson rejected this compromise and enough Democrats followed his lead to permanently end the chances for ratification.

Members
Those who have been identified as members of the faction include:
George W. Norris of Nebraska
William Borah of Idaho
Robert La Follette of Wisconsin
Hiram Johnson of California
James A. Reed of Missouri
Thomas Gore of Oklahoma
David I. Walsh of Massachusetts
Frank B. Brandegee of Connecticut
Albert B. Fall of New Mexico
Philander C. Knox of Pennsylvania
Lawrence Yates Sherman of Illinois
George H. Moses of New Hampshire
Asle J. Gronna of North Dakota
Joseph I. France of Maryland
Bert M. Fernald of Maine
Medill McCormick of Illinois
Charles S. Thomas of Colorado
Miles Poindexter of Washington

With the exception of Reed, Walsh, and Gore, all of the Irreconcilables were Republicans.

McCormick's position can be traced to his Anglophobia and nationalistic attitudes, Sherman's to personal antipathy to President Woodrow Wilson and his domestic policies.  Indeed, all of the Irreconcilables were bitter enemies of President Wilson, and he launched a nationwide speaking tour in the summer of 1919 to refute them. However, Wilson collapsed midway with a serious stroke that effectively ruined his leadership skills.

According to Stone's 1970 book, the Irreconcilables in the Senate fell into three loosely defined factions. One group was composed of isolationists and nationalists who proclaimed that America must be the sole commander of its destiny, and that membership in any international organization that might have power over the United States was unacceptable. A second group, the "realists", rejected isolationism in favor of limited cooperation among nations with similar interests. They thought the League of Nations would be too strong. A third group, the "idealists", called for a League with far reaching authority. The three factions cooperated to help defeat the treaty. All of them denounced the League as a tool of Britain and its nefarious empire.

Among the American public as a whole, the Irish Catholics and the German Americans were intensely opposed to the Treaty.

See also
 Treaty of Versailles
 Henry Cabot Lodge
 Woodrow Wilson

Notes

Further reading
 Bailey, Thomas A.  Woodrow Wilson and the Great Betrayal (1945)
 Duff, John B. "The Versailles Treaty and the Irish-Americans," Journal of American History Vol. 55, No. 3 (Dec., 1968), pp. 582–598 in JSTOR
 Stone, Ralph A. The Irreconcilables: The Fight Against the League of Nations. (University Press of Kentucky, 1970)
 Stone, Ralph A. "The Irreconcilables' Alternatives to the League," Mid America, 1967, Vol. 49 Issue 3, pp 163–173,
 Stone, Ralph A. "Two Illinois Senators among the Irreconcilables," Mississippi Valley Historical Review Vol. 50, No. 3 (Dec., 1963), pp. 443–465  in JSTOR
 Stone, Ralph A. ed. Wilson and the League of Nations (1967), articles by scholars.

League of Nations people
History of United States isolationism